
Weisselberg or Weißelberg is a surname and may refer to:

  (1883–1972), German CDU politician, Lord Mayor of Siegen
Roland Weisselberg (1933–2006), German Lutheran minister who self-immolated
 Allen Weisselberg (born 1947), American businessman and CFO of the Trump Organization
  (born 1968), German guitarist, songwriter and music producer

See also 
 der , a hill in Germany

German-language surnames